ZYYX is a Swedish desktop 3D printer, designed primarily for office and educational applications. Originally launched in 2014 by Magicfirm Europe AB, based at Chalmers Innovation in Gothenburg, the ZYYX 3D Printer is based on FFF technology and features include an automated levelling function, smell-free operation (most 3D printers tend to smell heavily of hot plastic) and an extruder head which is less prone to jamming.

Models 
The first model was released in 2014. The ZYYX 3D Printer was designed to provide an enclosed print environment with a fan and carbon filter to scrub fumes produced by the melted filament before exhausting them into the environment. The XYYZ+ Printer was released in 2016 to introduce improvements that provided a more stable printing environment.

See also
 Comparison of 3D printers
 Digital modeling and fabrication
 List of 3D printer manufacturers

References

External links
 Official website

3D printers
Computer-related introductions in 2014
2014 establishments in Sweden
Swedish brands
Robotics in Sweden
Fused filament fabrication
Chalmers University of Technology